

Kara Lake is a lake in the Potosí Department, Bolivia. At an elevation of 4522 m, its surface area is 13 km².

See also 
 Ch'iyar Quta

References 

Lakes of Potosí Department